Patience is Over the Rhine's second studio album, released independently in 1992, and re-released in 1993 as the band's first release on I.R.S. Records.

Track listing

Scampering Songs release (1992)
Jacksie
I've Been Slipping
How Does It Feel (To Be On My Mind)
HDIF (Reprise)
Sister
Il Est Dans Mon Poche
Flanders Fields
Little Genius
Lullabye
Circle Of Quiet
I Painted My Name
Rhapsodie
Grey Monologue

I.R.S. release (1993)
Jacksie (4:36)
I've Been Slipping (4:55)
Circle Of Quiet (4:14)
How Does It Feel (To Be On My Mind) (3:54)
HDIF (reprise) (2:10)
Sister (4:29)
Il Est Dans Mon Poche (2:34)
Flanders Fields (1:31)
Little Genius (1:53)
Lullabye (2:07)
I Painted My Name (5:00)
Rhapsodie (3:19)
Grey Monologue (1:25)

Personnel
Karin Bergquist - vocals and acoustic guitar
Ric Hordinski - electric and acoustic guitars
Brian Kelley - drums and percussion
Linford Detweiler - bass and keyboards

Additional personnel
John Catchings - cello

References

Over the Rhine (band) albums
1994 albums